Eswatini (formerly Swaziland), is a country in Southern Africa lying between Mozambique and South Africa.  The country is located at the geographic coordinates . Eswatini has an area of 17,363 square kilometres, of which 160 are water. The major regions of the country are Lowveld, Midveld and Highveld.

Climate 
The climate varies from tropical to near temperate. The seasons are the reverse of those in the Northern Hemisphere with December being mid-summer and June mid-winter. Generally speaking, rain falls mostly during the summer months, often in the form of thunderstorms. Winter is the dry season. Annual rainfall is highest on the Highveld in the west, between  depending on the year. Variations in temperature are also related to the altitude of the different regions.

Physical geography

The terrain largely consists of mountains and hills, with some moderately sloping plains.

As a landlocked country, Eswatini has neither coastline nor maritime claims.

Natural resources
Eswatini's natural resources are asbestos, coal, clay, cassiterite, hydropower, forests, small gold and diamond deposits, quarry stone and talc.

 of the country's land is irrigated. The following table describes land use in Eswatini:

Environment

Eswatini is prone to floods and drought. Soil erosion as a result of overgrazing is a growing problem.

Eswatini is part of the following international agreements: Biodiversity, Endangered Species, Nuclear Test Ban and Ozone Layer Protection. The country has signed, but not ratified the agreement on desertification and the law of the sea.

Extreme points

This is a list of the extreme points of Eswatini, the points that are farther north, south, east or west than any other location.
 Northernmost point - unnamed location of the border with South Africa immediately north of the village of Horo, Hhohho Region
 Easternmost point - the tripoint with South Africa and Mozambique, Lubombo Region
 Southernmost point - unnamed location on the border with South Africa, Shiselweni Region
 Westernmost point - a longitudinal segment of the border with South Africa, Manzini Region (not a single point)

References

External links
European Digital Archive on the Soil Maps of the world - soil maps of Swaziland